Ladislav "Les" Scheinflug  (born 1 October 1938) is a former football (soccer) player and coach.

Biography
Arriving in Australia in the early 1950s he lived as a youth at Villawood Migrant Hostel and played for the hostel soccer team (Villawood Tigers) He was picked to play in the Southern Districts representative soccer team during these years

Between November 1965 and April 1968 Scheinflug played 6 full international matches for Australia, scoring four goals.

Before the 1974 World Cup he became assistant to head coach Rale Rasic of the national side. He later served himself on several occasions as head coach of the Socceroos as well as the under 17 and 20 sides.

In 1979 Les Scheinflug won the Australian Championship and in 1980 the Australian Cup, both with Marconi Fairfield. In 1979, he was voted Coach of the Year by the Australian Soccer Press Association.

In the 2000 Australia Day Honours he was awarded an AM (Member of the Order of Australia) for services to soccer as a national player and coach.

Honours
Australian Hall of Fame Inaugural Inductee
Australian National Team Coach
Australian Youth Team Coach
1979 NSL Coach of the Year
New South Wales Representative Honours
1959 - Northern New South Wales
1965 - Torpedo Moscow, Chelsea
Representative Honours
1959 - NSWSF XI v The Rest
1965 - Sydney XI v Torpedo (c), Sydney XI v Hapoel Tel Aviv

References

1938 births
Living people
People from Bückeburg
German emigrants to Australia
Australian soccer players
Australia international soccer players
Australian soccer coaches
Australian expatriate soccer coaches
Australia national soccer team managers
Fiji national football team managers
Sydney Olympic FC managers
Sydney United 58 FC managers
Association football forwards
Association football midfielders
Footballers from Lower Saxony
Sydney FC Prague players
Members of the Order of Australia